Nakhon Pathom United Football Club, formerly known as Nakhon Pathom Football Club, is a Thailand professional football club based in Nakhon Pathom province and currently play in Thai League 2. Their home stadium is Nakhon Pathom Municipality Sport School Stadium. In 2008 season, the club finished at 9th place which became the highest league position in the club history.

In 2018, Club-licensing of this team didn't pass to play 2018 Thai League 2. This team were relegated to 2018 Thai League 4 Western Region.

History

1999–2006: Formation and early years
Nakhon Pathom F.C. was founded in 1999, the club started playing in the Thailand Provincial League. In 2004, Nakhon Pathom finished the season on a mid-table in the league. In the year 2005 it was the first time a place among the top three will be achieved and promote to the Thai Premier League was narrowly missed.

2007–2009: Promotion to the top flight
A year later, the result could be repeated. But the club was allowed to ascend to the highest league in Thailand, as was the second-placed a reserve team of Port Authority of Thailand FC. The association brought not only as a "provincial team," a new impetus in the league. But also the fans who traveled to away games and many were present at the home games. Nakhon Pathom was another club as well as Chonburi FC and Suphanburi FC the club in the Premier League who did not came from the capital Bangkok.

The first season in the Premier League, the club was able to finish in 11th place and boosted its bottom line a year later at number nine. For the 2009 season was the first time be with Michael Aspin and Michael Thomas Byrne committed two players from Great Britain, Both had already played together in England at Northwich Victoria.

2010–2012: Relegation and suspension
Nakhon Pathom were suspended for two years following the final playoff game of the 2010 season after a fracas in the penultimate game of the playoffs with Sisaket, a game that NP had to win to ensure that they would be promoted. The club are set to return to Division 1 for the 2013 campaign after serving their two-year punishment.

2017–present: Sukkoki years and resurgence

In 2017, Nakhon Pathom United administratively relegated to 2018 Thai League 4 by FA Thailand because the club did not send documents about club licensing in time.

After the club relegation to Thai League 4, Thongchai Sukkoki was hired as the club's coach. The club started again in the Tier 4 league by creating a new team and searching for young players from the initial selection of footballers, with only three players left from the previous season. Nakhon Pathom went on to won the 2018 Thai League 4 Western Region. In 2019, Thongchai Sukkoki won his second title after winning the 2019 Thai League 3 Lower Region and was promoted to Thai League 2. Under Sukkoki's management, the King Tiger play a style of football based on maintaining possession by building from the back, and good as combination play.

Academy
Nakhonpathom United opened its first youth academies in 2019 under the name The king tiger academy. The club's first technical director is Thongchai Sukkoki. The club started sending youth teams, under-10 and under-12, to participate in the 2021 Thailand Youth League.

Stadium
Nakhon Pathom currently play their home matches at Nakhon Pathom Municipality Sport School Stadium which is a sports stadium in Nakhon Pathom province, Thailand. The stadium holds 3,500 people.

The club's chairman Panuwat Sasomsup has plans to build a new football stadium, with based on the Mitr Phol Stadium of Ratchaburi Mitr Phol as a model, but downsizing the capacity to 10,000 seats.

Stadium and locations

Season by season domestic record

1 Nakhon Pathom were suspended for two years following the final playoff game, all results stood.

P = Played
W = Games won
D = Games drawn
L = Games lost
F = Goals for
A = Goals against
Pts = Points
Pos = Final position
TPL = Thai Premier League
QR1 = First Qualifying Round
QR2 = Second Qualifying Round
QR3 = Third Qualifying Round
QR4 = Fourth Qualifying Round
RInt = Intermediate Round
R1 = Round 1
R2 = Round 2
R3 = Round 3
R4 = Round 4
R5 = Round 5
R6 = Round 6
GR = Group stage
QF = Quarter-finals
SF = Semi-finals
RU = Runners-up
S = Shared
W = Winners

Players

Out on loan

Club officials 
As of 14 November 2017

Coaches
Coaches by year (2015–present)

  Chatchai Paholpat 
  Piyapong Pue-on  
  Anusorn Chumduangjai  
  Vimol Jankam  
  Peter Withe 
  Jason Withe 
  Thawatchai Damrong-Ongtrakul 
  Phayong Khunnaen 
  Thongchai Sukkoki

Honours

Domestic leagues
 Thai League 3
 Runners-up (1): 2019
 Thai League 3 Lower Region
 Champions (1): 2019
 Thai League 4
 Champions (1): 2018
 Thai League 4 Western Region
 Winners (1): 2018

References

External links
 
 Official fan site (archived 26 January 2010)

 
Sport in Nakhon Pathom province
Football clubs in Thailand
Association football clubs established in 1999
1999 establishments in Thailand